The Principality of Albania established diplomatic relations with the Kingdom of Italy in  1914 when Prince Wied delegated his envoy, Myfid Bey Libohova as its foreign affairs representative. Diplomatic ties between the two countries were put on pause following the Italian occupation of Sazan and Vlorë later that year and remained so until August 1920. Relations between the two countries resumed with Albania opening its first legation in Rome that resulted in the creation of several consulates that later expanded with the arrival to power of King Zog. During this period, Italian influence in the country grew steadily and was reinforced with the signing of the second Pact of Tirana on September 27, 1926 which gave Italy considerable economic and military influence as a way to stave off Yugoslav expansion. 
On March 19, 1936, the two countries signed new economic and financial agreements, as well as a secret military protocol that gave fascist Italy even more control over Albania. It was only a matter of time before Albania became part of Benito Mussolini’s plan of a new Roman empire. On April 7, 1939, Italian troops finally invaded the country and swiftly took control.

As a result of this occupation, political relations between the two countries were nonexistent. Italian troops were removed from the country in 1943 with the arrival of German Nazi forces who established a new puppet government.

After the war, Albania and Italy signed a peace treaty which went into effect on September 15, 1947. In May 1949, diplomatic relations were restored on a legal basis, following repeated requests from the Italian side. On February 2, 1954, the Ambassador Extraordinary and Plenipotentiary of the Italian Republic to Tirana presented his credentials. In the early years after the war, Italian governments in their policy towards Albania condemned the fascist aggression of April 7, 1939, attributing it to fascism and considering it as a  dark chapter in their history.  After the departure of Albania from the Warsaw Pact in 1968, initiatives were taken by Italy to further its ties with the Albanian government. Relations between the two countries saw some signs of improvement in the 1980s. At this time, there were exchanges of various delegations, visits by government members and an increase in the volume of trade and cultural exchanges.

After the fall of communism, Italy began to emerge as a strategic partner, assisting and contributing to institutional and economic reforms and the consolidation of the rule of law. Today, Italy is Albania's largest trade partner.

List of diplomatic representatives of Albania to Italy (1914–present)

References 

 
Italy
Albania